Hoven, Denmark is a small village in west-central Denmark, with a population of 219 (1 January 2022), on the Jutland Peninsula. Its elevation is 20 meters, and it is 2.8 km from Ørbæk (one of four Ørbæk's in the country), and 2.1 km from Dyrvig. The town has an old church and an old schoolhouse.

References

Cities and towns in the Central Denmark Region
Ringkøbing-Skjern Municipality